Renovate My Family is a 2004 reality television series on Fox which reaches out to improve the lives of troubled families.  While arguably it is very similar to ABC's Extreme Makeover: Home Edition, Renovate My Family focuses on both the family and the home. The show was short-lived, lasting only a season and ending production by the summer of 2005.

It begins with the families receiving the announcement, usually in an unexpected place where many people are present (and all are in on the surprise).  The family is then rushed back to their home where they are given a small amount of time to pack their things and leave their house once they are chosen because a group of home designers will build a new house for them in its place.  They have only one week to build the house.  The family gets to take part in tearing the house down as well.

The families who are chosen for Renovate My Family usually have some sort of family issue. While the house is being built, the host takes the family to a special retreat for that week where the family not only gets to spend time together but also must confront the family issue(s) through special counseling.  On the day before the house is due to be finished, the family is separated and taken to separate salons where each family member is given a makeover.  They are then reunited back at their home just before the new house is to be unveiled.

The show is hosted by Jay McGraw, son of Dr. Phil McGraw. Other participants included ex-Playboy Playmates and identical triplets Nicole, Erica and Jaclyn Dahm. McGraw went on to marry Erica Dahm, who is featured as one of the construction experts on the show.  

In 2005, Renovate My Family was one of several television programs cited in a class-action lawsuit filed by the Writers Guild of America concerning labor law violations.

Lawsuit
The Roisers, who were featured on the third episode of the series, filed a lawsuit against Fox and Rocket Science Laboratories, in which they claimed "shoddy work" which created safety hazards in their home.

References

External links
 

Fox Broadcasting Company original programming
2000s American reality television series
2004 American television series debuts
2004 American television series endings
Television series by Rocket Science Laboratories